Anostomus anostomus, also known as the striped headstander, striped anostomus, and striped anastomus, is a species of fish.

Description
This species is pale peach to pinkish in colour, with long, black, lateral stripes. It grows to approximately 20 cm long. The central stripe terminates in an arch shape at the base of the dorsal find. Anostomus anostomus appears very similar to Anostomus ternetzi, but can be distinguished by the presence of red tinting on the fins.

Distribution
Anostomus anostomus is native to South America, and can be found in the Orinoco River, in the Guayana Region of the Upper Amazon.

Diet
This species is both a limnivore and omnivore.

References

Anostomidae
Fish of South America
Fish described in 1758
Taxa named by Carl Linnaeus